Jere Hård (born 7 December 1978 in Jyväskylä, Finland) is a retired male freestyle and butterfly swimmer from Finland. He twice swam for his native country at the Olympics: in 2000 and 2004.

He mainly excelled in the – non-Olympic – 50 m butterfly event, in both long (50 m) and short course (25 m).

References

1978 births
Living people
Finnish male butterfly swimmers
Finnish male freestyle swimmers
Swimmers at the 2000 Summer Olympics
Swimmers at the 2004 Summer Olympics
Olympic swimmers of Finland
Sportspeople from Jyväskylä
European Aquatics Championships medalists in swimming
21st-century Finnish people